Hippy Singmanee is a Thai former Muay Thai fighter. He was a  three time Lumpinee Stadium champion in the lower weight classes during the Muay Thai golden era.

Biography & career
Hippy was born he starteted training in Muay Thai at the age of 10 with his brothers Thungsong and Kompayak, trained by their father. Hippy had his first fight a few months after starting training, his ring name was given to him by his father due to the fact that he had long hair during his childhood. Hippy became a young star in South Thailand winning multiple regional titles. His younger brother Kompayak Singmanee also became a notable stadium champion.

Hippy made his debut in the Bangkok area in 1982 at the age of 15. In Bangkok Hippy Fought for the most prominent promotor of the time Songchai Rattanasuban. He quickly gained the 104 lbs Lumpinee Stadium title which was changed into the 105 lbs title.

He is considered one of the best "small fighter" after dominating in the 105 and 108 lbs division Hippy kept on going up weight classes while giving up size to most of his opponents. The highest purse of his career was of 120,000 baht, he received it for a fight against Veeraphol Sahaprom

After retirement Hippy became a trainer in the Bangkok area where he owns a gym and occasionally works as a fight promotor in his native province.

Titles & honours
Lumpinee Stadium
 1986 Lumpinee Stadium 105 lbs Champion (defended once)
 1988 Lumpinee Stadium 105 lbs Champion
 1988 Lumpinee Stadium 108 lbs Champion (defended once)

Fight record

|-  style="text-align:center; background:#fbb;"
| 1996-09-06|| Loss ||align=left| Teelek Por Samranchai || Lumpinee Stadium || Bangkok, Thailand || Decision || 5 || 3:00

|-  style="text-align:center; background:#cfc;"
| 1995-|| Win ||align=left| Kaolan Kaopichit || Lumpinee Stadium || Bangkok, Thailand || KO || 2 ||

|-  style="text-align:center; background:#cfc;"
| 1995-|| Win ||align=left| Singnum Nongkeepahuyuth || Lumpinee Stadium || Bangkok, Thailand || KO || 2 ||

|-  style="text-align:center; background:#fbb;"
| 1995-|| Loss ||align=left| Saenchai Jirakriengkrai || Lumpinee Stadium || Bangkok, Thailand || Decision || 5 || 3:00

|-  style="text-align:center; background:#fbb;"
| 1995-|| Loss ||align=left| Saenkeng Sor.Weerakul || Lumpinee Stadium || Bangkok, Thailand || Decision || 5 || 3:00

|-  style="text-align:center; background:#cfc;"
| 1995-04-24|| Win ||align=left| Singsamphan Kiatsingnoi || Rajadamnern Stadium || Bangkok, Thailand || KO || 2 ||

|-  style="text-align:center; background:#cfc;"
| 1995-04-04|| Win ||align=left| Chanrit Tor.Sunan || Lumpinee Stadium || Bangkok, Thailand || KO (Elbow) || 5 ||

|-  style="text-align:center; background:#cfc;"
| 1995-|| Win ||align=left| Denkaosen Kaowichit || Lumpinee Stadium || Bangkok, Thailand || Decision || 5 || 3:00

|-  style="text-align:center; background:#fbb;"
| 1995-|| Loss ||align=left| Sakpaitoon Dejrat || Lumpinee Stadium || Bangkok, Thailand || Decision || 5 || 3:00

|-  style="text-align:center; background:#cfc;"
| 1995-01-03|| Win ||align=left| Saenchai Jirakriengkrai || Lumpinee Stadium || Bangkok, Thailand || TKO || 2 ||

|-  style="text-align:center; background:#cfc;"
| 1994-|| Win ||align=left| Denkaosen Kaowichit || Lumpinee Stadium || Bangkok, Thailand || Decision || 5 || 3:00

|-  style="text-align:center; background:#fbb;"
| 1994-|| Loss||align=left| Chaichana Dettawee || Lumpinee Stadium || Bangkok, Thailand || Decision || 5 || 3:00

|-  style="text-align:center; background:#cfc;"
| 1994-|| Win ||align=left| Saenkhom Sakphanu || Lumpinee Stadium || Bangkok, Thailand || Decision || 5 || 3:00

|-  style="text-align:center; background:#cfc;"
| 1994-08-26|| Win ||align=left| Sot Luknongyangtoi || Lumpinee Stadium || Bangkok, Thailand || Decision || 5 || 3:00

|-  style="text-align:center; background:#cfc;"
| 1994|| Win ||align=left| Sakpaitoon Dejrat || Lumpinee Stadium || Bangkok, Thailand || Decision || 5 || 3:00

|-  style="text-align:center; background:#cfc;"
| 1994-|| Win ||align=left| Sot Luknongyangtoi || Lumpinee Stadium || Bangkok, Thailand || Decision || 5 || 3:00

|-  style="text-align:center; background:#fbb;"
| 1994-|| Loss||align=left| Saenkhom Sakphanu || Lumpinee Stadium || Bangkok, Thailand || Decision || 5 || 3:00

|-  style="text-align:center; background:#fbb;"
| 1994-|| Loss||align=left| Kongka Nor.Nakpathom || Lumpinee Stadium || Bangkok, Thailand || Decision || 5 || 3:00

|-  style="text-align:center; background:#fbb;"
| 1994-|| Loss||align=left| Yodsiam Sor.Prantalay|| Lumpinee Stadium || Bangkok, Thailand || Decision || 5 || 3:00

|-  style="background:#fbb;"
| 1993-12-24 || Loss ||align=left| Sitthichai Phetbangprang || Lumpinee Stadium || Bangkok, Thailand || Decision || 5 || 3:00

|-  style="background:#fbb;"
| 1993- || Loss ||align=left| Sitthichai Phetbangprang || Lumpinee Stadium || Bangkok, Thailand || Decision || 5 || 3:00

|-  style="background:#cfc;"
| 1993- || Win ||align=left| Khumsub Phetmuangkon || || Chaiyaphum, Thailand || Decision || 5 || 3:00

|-  style="background:#fbb;"
| 1993- || Loss ||align=left| Katanyu Sitesso || Lumpinee Stadium || Bangkok, Thailand || Decision || 5 || 3:00

|-  style="background:#cfc;"
| 1993- || Win ||align=left| Kongsak Sor Theptong || || Chonburi, Thailand || Decision || 5 || 3:00

|-  style="background:#fbb;"
| 1993-07-24 || Loss ||align=left| Netnarin Fairtex || Lumpinee Stadium || Bangkok, Thailand || Decision || 5 || 3:00

|-  style="background:#fbb;"
| 1993-06-19 || Loss ||align=left| Singtong Kiatchatchai || Lumpinee Stadium || Bangkok, Thailand || Decision || 5 || 3:00

|-  style="background:#cfc;"
| 1993- || Win ||align=left| Phet Narumon || Lumpinee Stadium || Bangkok, Thailand || Decision || 5 || 3:00

|-  style="background:#cfc;"
| 1993- || Win ||align=left| Chaiyai Sitkaruhat || Lumpinee Stadium || Bangkok, Thailand || Decision || 5 || 3:00

|-  style="background:#fbb;"
| 1993- || Loss ||align=left| Pleongphaya Sitkrurot|| || Nakhon Si Thammarat, Thailand || Decision || 5 || 3:00

|-  style="background:#fbb;"
| 1993- || Loss ||align=left| Phichitsak Saksaengmanee || Lumpinee Stadium || Bangkok, Thailand || Decision || 5 || 3:00

|-  style="background:#cfc;"
| 1993- || Win ||align=left| Chaiyai Sitkaruhat || Lumpinee Stadium || Bangkok, Thailand || Decision || 5 || 3:00

|-  style="background:#fbb;"
| 1993- || Loss ||align=left| Keng Lorsawat || Lumpinee Stadium || Bangkok, Thailand || Decision || 5 || 3:00

|-  style="background:#fbb;"
| 1993- || Loss ||align=left| Saenkeng Sor.Weerakul || Lumpinee Stadium || Bangkok, Thailand || Decision || 5 || 3:00

|-  style="background:#fbb;"
| 1992-10-17 || Loss ||align=left| Hansuk Prasathinpanomrung || Lumpinee Stadium || Bangkok, Thailand || Decision || 5 || 3:00

|-  style="background:#fbb;"
| 1992-06-20 || Loss ||align=left| Nongnarong Luksang || Lumpinee Stadium || Bangkok, Thailand || Decision || 5 || 3:00

|-  style="background:#cfc;"
| 1992-04-05 || Win ||align=left| Kunasin Sor.Jongkit || Lumpinee Stadium || Bangkok, Thailand || Decision || 5 || 3:00

|-  style="background:#fbb;"
| 1992-03-18 || Loss ||align=left| Singsamphan Kiatsingnoi || Lumpinee Stadium || Bangkok, Thailand || Decision || 5 || 3:00

|-  style="background:#cfc;"
| 1991-08-06 || Win ||align=left| Methanoi Maliwan || Lumpinee Stadium || Bangkok, Thailand || Decision || 5 || 3:00

|-  style="background:#cfc;"
| 1991-04-20 || Win ||align=left| Sornsuknoi Sakwichian || Lumpinee Stadium || Bangkok, Thailand || Decision || 5 || 3:00

|-  style="background:#cfc;"
| 1991-03-16 || Win ||align=left| Pornprasit Sitsiyontua || Lumpinee Stadium || Bangkok, Thailand || Decision || 5 || 3:00

|-  style="background:#cfc;"
| 1991-02-23 || Win ||align=left| Pornprasit Sitsiyontua || Lumpinee Stadium || Bangkok, Thailand || Decision || 5 || 3:00

|-  style="background:#fbb;"
| 1990-11-20 || Loss ||align=left| Khanuphet Johnnygym || Lumpinee Stadium || Bangkok, Thailand || KO || 1 ||

|-  style="background:#fbb;"
| 1990-11-02 || Loss ||align=left| Morakot Sor.Tamarangsri || Lumpinee Stadium || Bangkok, Thailand || Decision || 5 || 3:00

|-  style="background:#fbb;"
| 1990-10-05 || Loss ||align=left| Thailand Pinsinchai|| Lumpinee Stadium || Bangkok, Thailand || Decision || 5 || 3:00

|-  style="background:#cfc;"
| 1990-09-28 || Win ||align=left| Mondam Kunsenser || Rajadamnern Stadium || Bangkok, Thailand || Decision || 5 || 3:00

|-  style="background:#fbb;"
| 1990-08-20 || Loss ||align=left| Sornsuknoi Sakwichian|| Rajadamnern Stadium || Bangkok, Thailand || Decision || 5 || 3:00

|-  style="background:#cfc;"
| 1990-07-20 || Win ||align=left| Nungubon Sitlerchai || Lumpinee Stadium || Bangkok, Thailand || Decision || 5 || 3:00

|-  style="background:#fbb;"
| 1990-06-08 || Loss ||align=left| Jaroensap Kiatbanchong || Lumpinee Stadium || Bangkok, Thailand || KO || 2 ||

|-  style="background:#fbb;
| 1990-05-15 || Loss ||align=left| Nungubon Sitlerchai || Lumpinee Stadium || Bangkok, Thailand || Decision || 5 || 3:00

|-  style="background:#fbb;
| 1990-03-30 || Loss ||align=left| Tukthathong Por.Pongsawang || Lumpinee Stadium || Bangkok, Thailand || Decision || 5 || 3:00
|-
! style=background:white colspan=9 |

|-  style="background:#fbb;
| 1990-02-24 || Loss ||align=left| Kruekchai Sor.Kettalingchan || Lumpinee Stadium || Bangkok, Thailand || Decision || 5 || 3:00

|- style="background:#cfc;"
| 1989-12-31|| Win ||align=left| Jaid Seddak ||    || Paris, France || Decision || 5 || 3:00
|-
! style=background:white colspan=9 |

|- style="background:#fbb;"
| 1989-11-20 || Loss||align=left| Chainoi Muangsurin || Rajadamnern Stadium || Bangkok, Thailand  || Decision || 5 || 3:00

|- style="background:#fbb;"
| 1989-10-23 || Loss ||align=left| Namkabuan Nongkeepahuyuth ||  || Koh Samui, Thailand  || Decision || 5 || 3:00

|- style="background:#fbb;"
| 1989-10-06 || Loss ||align=left| Toto Por.Pongsawang || Lumpinee Stadium ||  Bangkok, Thailand  || Decision || 5 || 3:00

|- style="background:#cfc;"
| 1989-09-08 || Win ||align=left| Chainoi Muangsurin || Lumpinee Stadium || Bangkok, Thailand  || Decision || 5 || 3:00

|- style="background:#cfc;"
| 1989-07-11 || Win ||align=left| Namkabuan Nongkeepahuyuth || Lumpinee Stadium || Bangkok, Thailand  || TKO (Doctor Stoppage) || 3 ||
|-
! style=background:white colspan=9 |

|- style="background:#fbb;"
| 1989-06-13 || Loss ||align=left| Phanphet Muangsurin ||  Lumpinee Stadium  || Bangkok, Thailand || Decision || 5 || 3:00

|- style="background:#fbb;"
| 1989-04-20 || Loss ||align=left| Veeraphol Sahaprom ||  Rajadamnern Stadium  || Bangkok, Thailand || Decision || 5 || 3:00

|- style="background:#fbb;"
| 1989-03-31 || Loss ||align=left| Odnoi Lukprabat ||  ||  Pattani, Thailand  || Decision || 5 || 3:00

|- style="background:#fbb;"
| 1989-03-21 || Loss ||align=left| Odnoi Lukprabat || Lumpinee Stadium ||  Bangkok, Thailand  || Decision || 5 || 3:00

|- style="background:#fbb;"
| 1989-01-31 || Loss ||align=left| Karuhat Sor.Supawan || Lumpinee Stadium ||  Bangkok, Thailand  || Decision || 5 || 3:00

|- style="background:#cfc;"
| 1988-11-04 ||Win ||align=left| Veeraphol Sahaprom ||  Lumpinee Stadium  || Bangkok, Thailand || Decision || 5 || 3:00

|-  style="text-align:center; background:#fbb;"
| 1988-10-11|| Loss ||align=left| Paruhatlek Sitchunthong || Lumpinee Stadium || Bangkok, Thailand || Decision || 5 || 3:00

|- style="background:#cfc;"
| 1988-08-30 || Win||align=left| Karuhat Sor.Supawan || Lumpinee Stadium ||  Bangkok, Thailand  || Decision || 5 || 3:00
|-
! style=background:white colspan=9 |

|- style="background:#fbb;"
| 1988-07-26 || Loss ||align=left| Pongsiri Por Ruamrudee ||  Lumpinee Stadium ||  Bangkok, Thailand  || Decision || 5 || 3:00

|- style="background:#cfc;"
| 1988-06-24 || Win||align=left| Karuhat Sor.Supawan || Lumpinee Stadium ||  Bangkok, Thailand  || Decision || 5 || 3:00

|- style="background:#cfc;"
| 1988-05-08 || Win ||align=left| Seesod Sor.Ritthichai|| Lumpinee Stadium ||  Bangkok, Thailand  || Decision || 5 || 3:00

|- style="background:#fbb;"
| 1988-04-15 || Loss ||align=left| Veeraphol Sahaprom || Ramkomut Pattani Boxing Stadium  ||  Pattani Province, Thailand  || Decision || 5 || 3:00

|-  style="text-align:center; background:#fbb;"
| 1988-03-04|| Loss||align=left| Paruhatlek Sitchunthong || Lumpinee Stadium || Bangkok, Thailand || Decision || 5 || 3:00

|- style="background:#cfc;"
| 1988-01-26 || Win ||align=left| Saeksan Sitchomthong || Lumpinee Stadium ||  Bangkok, Thailand  || KO || 3 || 
|-
! style=background:white colspan=9 |

|-  style="text-align:center; background:#cfc;"
| 1987-12-29|| Win ||align=left| Pungluang Kiatanan || Lumpinee Stadium || Bangkok, Thailand || Decision || 5 || 3:00

|-  style="background:#fbb;"
| 1987-07-31 || Loss ||align=left| Langsuan Panyuthaphum || Lumpinee Stadium || Bangkok, Thailand || KO (Knees)|| 3 ||

|-  style="background:#fbb;"
| 1987-07-04 || Loss ||align=left| Maewpa Sun Miskawan || Lumpinee vs Rajadamnern champion || Pattani, Thailand || KO (Elbow)|| 4 ||

|-  style="background:#cfc;"
| 1987-05-19 || Win||align=left| Warunee Sor.Ploenchit || Lumpinee Stadium|| Bangkok, Thailand || Decision|| 5 ||3:00

|- style="background:#cfc;"
| 1987- || Win ||align=left| Karuhat Sor.Supawan || Lumpinee Stadium ||  Bangkok, Thailand  || Decision || 5 || 3:00
|-
! style=background:white colspan=9 |

|-  style="text-align:center; background:#cfc;"
| 1987-01-13|| Win ||align=left| Dokmaipa Por Pongsawang || Lumpinee Stadium || Bangkok, Thailand || Decision || 5 || 3:00

|-  style="text-align:center; background:#cfc;"
| 1986-12-19|| Win ||align=left| Pungluang Kiatanan || Huamark Stadium || Bangkok, Thailand || Decision || 5 || 3:00
|-
! style=background:white colspan=9 |

|-  style="text-align:center; background:#cfc;"
| 1986-11-25|| Win ||align=left| Panomrunglek Chor.Sawat || Lumpinee Stadium || Bangkok, Thailand || Decision || 5 || 3:00

|-  style="text-align:center; background:#fbb;"
| 1986-10-14|| Loss||align=left| Pairojnoi Sor Siamchai || Lumpinee Stadium || Bangkok, Thailand || Decision || 5 || 3:00

|-  style="text-align:center; background:#cfc;"
| 1986-09-09|| Win ||align=left| Dokmaipa Por Pongsawang || Lumpinee Stadium || Bangkok, Thailand || Decision || 5 || 3:00
|-
! style=background:white colspan=9 |

|-  style="text-align:center; background:#fbb;"
| 1986-08-04|| Loss||align=left| Pungluang Kiatanan || Lumpinee Stadium || Bangkok, Thailand || Decision || 5 || 3:00

|-  style="text-align:center; background:#cfc;"
| 1986-07-11|| Win ||align=left| Songchainoi Por.Somchit || Lumpinee Stadium || Bangkok, Thailand || Decision || 5 || 3:00

|-  style="text-align:center; background:#fbb;"
| 1986-05-30|| Loss||align=left| Haodong Sor.Tasanee || Lumpinee Stadium || Bangkok, Thailand || Decision || 5 || 3:00

|-  style="text-align:center; background:#cfc;"
| 1986-04-11|| Win||align=left| Sameliyem Lilathai|| || Yala, Thailand || Decision || 5 || 3:00

|-  style="text-align:center; background:#fbb;"
| 1986-03-08|| Loss||align=left| Chaiyo Sor.Jitpattana || Petchyindee, Si Kim Yong Stadium|| Hat Yai, Thailand || Decision || 5 || 3:00

|-  style="text-align:center; background:#cfc;"
| 1986-02-09|| Win ||align=left| Pinyo Singpatong || || Phuket, Thailand || Decision || 5 || 3:00

|-  style="text-align:center; background:#cfc;"
| 1986-01-31|| Win ||align=left| Dentaksin Kiatrataphol || || Su-ngai Kolok, Thailand || Decision || 5 || 3:00

|-  style="text-align:center; background:#fbb;"
| 1985-11-23|| Loss||align=left| Morakot Sor.Tamanrangsri ||  || Hat Yai, Thailand || Decision || 5 || 3:00

|-  style="text-align:center; background:#cfc;"
| 1985-10-15|| Win||align=left| Chaichan Sor Sorklin|| || Samrong, Thailand || Decision || 5 || 3:00

|-  style="text-align:center; background:#fbb;"
| 1985-09-30|| Loss||align=left| Morakot Sor.Tamanrangsri || Rajadamnern Stadium || Bangkok, Thailand || Decision || 5 || 3:00

|-  style="text-align:center; background:#cfc;"
| 1985-08-31|| Win||align=left| Supermin Kiatsathaphon || || Hat Yai, Thailand || Decision || 5 || 3:00

|-  style="text-align:center; background:#cfc;"
| 1985-08-10|| Win||align=left| Niwet Sor.Sawat || || Chumphon, Thailand ||Decision || 5 || 3:00

|-  style="text-align:center; background:#cfc;"
| 1985-07-19|| Win||align=left| Superlek Kiatchaiyut || || Hat Yai, Thailand ||Decision || 5 || 3:00

|-  style="text-align:center; background:#fbb;"
| 1985-07-13|| Loss||align=left| Supermin Kiatsathaphon || || Nakhon Si Thammarat, Thailand || Decision || 5 || 3:00

|-  style="text-align:center; background:#cfc;"
| 1985-07-05|| Win||align=left| Dejtaha Saklaempho || || Yala, Thailand || KO || 4 ||

|-  style="text-align:center; background:#cfc;"
| 1985-06-15|| Win||align=left| Nuapetch Sor.Tasanee || || Chumphon, Thailand || KO || 5 ||

|-  style="text-align:center; background:#fbb;"
| 1985-04-25 || Loss||align=left| Niwet Sor.Sawat || || Prachuap Khiri Khan, Thailand ||Decision || 5 || 3:00

|-  style="text-align:center; background:#cfc;"
| 1985-04-11|| Win||align=left| Jinreetong Sitsahaphan || || Chumphon, Thailand || KO || 4 ||

|-  style="text-align:center; background:#cfc;"
| 1985-04-06|| Win||align=left| Thongsabad Muangchaiyaphum || Mai Muangkhon, Ruenruedi Stadium || Nakhon Si Thammarat, Thailand || Decision || 5 || 3:00
|-
! style=background:white colspan=9 |

|-  style="text-align:center; background:#fbb;"
| 1985-|| Loss||align=left| Saichon Pichitsuk || Lumpinee Stadium || Bangkok, Thailand || Decision || 5 || 3:00

|-  style="text-align:center; background:#cfc;"
| 1985-03-03|| Win||align=left| Khunponnoi Kiatphetnoi|| Rajadamnern Stadium || Bangkok, Thailand || Decision || 5 || 3:00

|-  style="text-align:center; background:#fbb;"
| 1985-01-28|| Loss||align=left| Thongsabad Muangchaiyaphum || Rajadamnern Stadium || Bangkok, Thailand || Decision || 5 || 3:00

|- style="background:#cfc;"
| 1984-12-13 || Win||align=left| Boonmee Sitchuchon|| Rajadamnern Stadium ||  Bangkok, Thailand  || Decision || 5 || 3:00
|-
! style=background:white colspan=9 |

|-
| colspan=9 | Legend:

MC
 Television 
 2022 : Muay Thai Fighter X - At OTF Stadium Hua Hin Prachuap Khiri Khan (Produced By ) Live every Saturday from 18:00 a.m.-20:00 p.m. On Air JKN18, YouTube:JKN18 Starting Saturday, February 19, 2022 - present (together with แบนท่าพระ (เดชา คูรัตนเวช), Kittisak Thabthong (กิตติศักดิ์ ทาบทอง))

References

1967 births
Living people
Hippy Singmanee
Muay Thai trainers
Hippy Singmanee
Hippy Singmanee
Thai television personalities